The 1913 Southern Intercollegiate Athletic Association football season was the college football games played by the member schools of the Southern Intercollegiate Athletic Association as part of the 1913 college football season. The season began on September 27. Conference play began that day with Alabama hosting Howard.

Teams other than Vanderbilt had a chance to win a title, and newspapers covered football more than the World Series for the first time.

Fuzzy Woodruff says the Southern newspapers began to cover football more than the World Series. The Auburn Tigers won the conference, posting an undefeated, 8–0 record. Auburn captain Kirk Newell was later a hero of World War I. The 1913 Tigers were retroactively recognized as a national champion by the Billingsley Report's alternative calculation which considers teams' margin of victory. Auburn does not claim the title.
 
Tennessee won its first SIAA game since 1910. Ole Miss was suspended from SIAA play.

Regular season

SIAA teams in bold.

Week One

Week Two

Week Three

Week Four

Week Five

Week Six

Week Seven

Week Eight

Week Nine

Week Ten

Awards and honors

All-Americans

HB - Bob McWhorter, Georgia (PHD-1)

All-Southern team

The composite All-Southern team formed by the selection of 18 sporting writers culled by the Atlanta Constitution included:

Notes

References